Suzanne Beauchamp-Niquet (11 August 1932 – 22 February 2011) was a Liberal party member of the House of Commons of Canada. She was an administrator by career.

Born in Russell, Ontario, she attended schools in Vanier, Val d'Or and Abitibi-Jonquière. She also attended the Collège des Soeurs Grises de la Croix.

She was elected at the Roberval electoral district in the 1980 federal election and served in the 32nd Canadian Parliament. Following defeat in the 1984 federal election to Benoît Bouchard of the Progressive Conservative party, she left federal politics.

Beauchamp-Niquet also served as mayor of Dolbeau, Quebec from 1977 to 1981.

References

External links
 

1932 births
2011 deaths
Members of the House of Commons of Canada from Quebec
Liberal Party of Canada MPs
Women members of the House of Commons of Canada
People from Russell, Ontario
Franco-Ontarian people
Mayors of places in Quebec
People from Dolbeau-Mistassini
Women mayors of places in Quebec